The Samsung Galaxy S4 Active is an Android smartphone produced by Samsung Electronics and released in June 2013. As variant of the Samsung Galaxy S4, the S4 Active contains similar specifications, but it also features water and dustproofing designed around the IP67 specifications, along with a more rugged design. The Galaxy S4 Active was succeeded by the S5 Active.

Release 
The S4 Active was first released in the United States by AT&T on 21 June 2013 in "Dive Blue" and "Urban Gray" colors, its model number is SGH-i537.  An international version of the S4 Active was released in Q3 2013, its model number is GT-I9295.

Specifications 

The S4 Active inherits most of its hardware components from the S4, including an identical Snapdragon 600 quad-core processor, 2 GB of RAM, and a 5-inch 1080p display. However, its display is a TFT LCD display and uses Gorilla Glass 2 instead of the S4's Super AMOLED and Gorilla Glass 3, and the S4 Active uses an 8 megapixel rear camera instead of the 13 rear megapixel camera of the S4. Its hardware design is similar to the S4, except it is slightly thicker, has metallic rivets, includes flaps to cover ports when not in use, and uses three physical navigation keys instead of a physical home key and capacitive back/menu keys like the S4. The S4 Active launched with similar software to the S4, Android 4.2.2 "Jelly Bean" with TouchWiz. Its camera software replaces the "Dual Shot" mode with an "Aqua Mode" designed for taking photos underwater, which disables the touchscreen and uses the volume keys as a shutter.

An update to Android 4.4.2 "KitKat" was released for the AT&T model in April 2014, although the deployment was temporarily halted until June 2014 due to technical issues. International version received its KitKat update in late May 2014. In April 2015, the S4 Active was updated to Android 5.0.1 "Lollipop".

Reception 
Engadget was positive in its review of the S4 Active, noting that the S4 Active had a more "high-end" appearance than the normal S4, had a more comfortable feel due to its thicker build, and that its buttons were "definitely superior" from a usability standpoint. However, regressions from the S4 were also noted, such as its lower display quality in comparison to the Super AMOLED.

See also
 Samsung Galaxy S series
 Samsung Rugby Smart

References

External links
 

Mobile phones introduced in 2013
Discontinued smartphones
Samsung Galaxy
Samsung mobile phones
Mobile phones with user-replaceable battery